Uvariodendron oligocarpum is a species of plant in the family Annonaceae. It is endemic to Tanzania.

References

Flora of Tanzania
oligocarpum
Vulnerable plants
Taxonomy articles created by Polbot